NBUF may refer to:
 National Black United Fund
 National Black United Front